Nakhal Fort is a large fortification in Al Batinah Region of Oman. It is named after the Wilayah of Nakhal. The fort houses a museum, operated by the Ministry of Tourism, which has exhibits of historic guns, and the fort also hosts a weekly goat market.

History
The fort, also known as Husn Al Heem, was named after the state of Nakhal that exists above the old village of Nakhl. Imams of Wadi Bani Kharous and the Ya'arubah dynasty resided here in the past. Over the centuries, it underwent many renovations and improvements. It was reconstructed by Omani architects in the 17th century. Initially built as a protective measure for an area oasis and nearby trade routes, it passes through the regional capital of Nizwa. The gateway and towers seen now were extensions built in 1834 attributed to imam Said bin Sultan. In 1990, it was fully renovated.

In November 2003, Prince Charles visited the restored fort during an official visit to Oman.

Overview
 
It is situated on a rocky prominence at the foot of Jebel Nakhal, a spur of the main Western Hajar range. It is to the northeast of Jabal Akhdar also called green mountain. Nakhal Fort is surrounded by orchards of palm trees. Its battlements provide a view of the Al-Batinah Region. The ancient Nakhal village is below the fort and close by is the warm springs of Ain A'Thawwarah. Nakhal Fort is one of several fortifications in the Al Batinah Region, the others being Al Hazim, Al-Sifalah, Rustaq, and Shinas forts.

Built in the architectural style of the Sultanate of Oman, it is unique in that it was built to fit around an irregularly-shaped rock, with some rock exposures jutting out into the interiors. The fort houses a museum, operated by the Ministry of Tourism with exhibits of historic guns. A weekly Friday goat auction market takes place within the precincts of the fort. During recent renovations the fort has been fitted with traditional furniture, handicrafts and historic artifacts.

References

Bibliography

External links

Nakhal
Forts in Oman
Towers completed in 1834